Philip Mathews  was Archdeacon of Connor from 1689 to 1694.

Mathews was educated at Trinity College, Dublin. After his five years as Archdeacon he was then Precentor until his death in 1740.

References

1740 deaths
Archdeacons of Connor
Alumni of Trinity College Dublin